Johnny Walker (14 November 1908 – 2 February 1980) was an Australian rules footballer who played with Essendon in the Victorian Football League (VFL).

Notes

External links 

1908 births
1980 deaths
Australian rules footballers from Victoria (Australia)
Essendon Football Club players
Stawell Football Club players